"Those Lazy-Hazy-Crazy Days of Summer" is a popular song composed by Hans Carste. It was originally written as "Du spielst 'ne tolle Rolle", with German lyrics by Hans Bradtke (de), and was first recorded under that title in 1962 by Willy Hagara.

Nat King Cole recording
In 1963, it was recorded by Nat King Cole, with English lyrics written by Charles Tobias on a theme of nostalgia.  Cole's version, arranged by Ralph Carmichael and produced by Lee Gillette, reached number 6 on the US Hot 100. On the US Middle-Road Singles chart, "Those Lazy-Hazy-Crazy Days of Summer" reached number 3. It was the opening track of Cole's 1963 album of the same name.

Chart performance

Copyrights

Original copyrights

 

 Vol. 17; Part 5, No. 2, July–December 1963 (1964). "Du spielst 'ne tolle Rolle". © Edition Primus Rolf Budde KG; 13 Feb 1962; EP28432. p. 1314.
<li> Vol. 17; Part 5, No. 1, January–June1963 (1964). "Those Lazy-Hazy-Crazy Days of Summer". © on English lyrics & new version; Comet Music Corp.; 6 May 1963; EP175569. p. 598.

References

Songs about nostalgia
1962 songs
Songs written by Charles Tobias
Songs written by Hans Carste
Nat King Cole songs
Capitol Records singles
1963 singles